National University of Ireland (NUI)  is a university constituency in Ireland, which currently elects three senators to Seanad Éireann. Its electorate is the graduates of the university, which has a number of constituent universities. It previously elected members to the House of Commons of the United Kingdom (1918–1921), to the House of Commons of Southern Ireland (1921) and to Dáil Éireann (1918–1936).

Representation

House of Commons of the United Kingdom

Under the Redistribution of Seats (Ireland) Act 1918, NUI was enfranchised as a new university constituency and continued to be entitled to be represented by one Member of Parliament in the British House of Commons until the dissolution of Parliament on 26 October 1922, shortly before the Irish Free State became a dominion outside the United Kingdom on 6 December 1922. In 1918 the electorate included all registered male graduates over 21 (or over 19 if in the armed services) and all female graduates over 30. There were 3,819 voters registered for the 1918 general election. Most, if not all, of those electors would have been plural voters also entitled to vote in a territorial constituency. The 1918 general election took place on 14 December and the results were declared on 28 December, except for the university constituencies. NUI voted between 18 and 22 December and the result was declared on 23 December. Eoin MacNeill was elected (and also for Londonderry City) standing for Sinn Féin and therefore did not take his seat in Westminster, instead serving as a member of the first Dáil Éireann.

House of Commons of Southern Ireland
The Government of Ireland Act 1920 established a devolved home rule legislature, within the United Kingdom, for twenty-six Irish counties which were designated Southern Ireland. NUI was given four seats in the House of Commons of Southern Ireland. At the 1921 Southern Ireland House of Commons election, all 128 seats were elected unopposed. Of these, 124 were Sinn Féin members, who formed the TDs of the Second Dáil. This included the four representatives of the NUI.

The Parliament was dissolved as part of the arrangements under the Anglo-Irish Treaty in 1922.

Dáil Éireann

In the 1918 general election, Sinn Féin contested the election on the basis that they would not take seats in the United Kingdom Parliament but would establish a revolutionary assembly in Dublin.

The university was, in Irish republican theory, entitled to return one Teachta Dála (known in English as a Deputy) in 1918 to serve in the Irish Republic's First Dáil. This revolutionary body assembled on 21 January 1919. In republican theory every MP elected in Ireland was a member of the First Dáil. In practice only Sinn Féin members participated, including the Deputy for the university.

In May 1921, elections were held to the parliaments established under the Government of Ireland Act 1920. Sinn Féin had decided to use the polls for the House of Commons of Northern Ireland and the House of Commons of Southern Ireland together as an election for the Irish Republic's Second Dáil. At the last meeting of the First Dáil on 10 May 1921, it passed a motion, the first three parts of which expressed this constitutional position.
 That the parliamentary elections which are to take place during the present month be regarded as elections to Dáil Éireann.
 That all deputies duly returned at these elections be regarded as members of Dáil Éireann and allowed to take their seats on subscribing to the proposed Oath of Allegiance.
 That the present Dáil dissolve automatically as soon as the new body has been summoned by the President and called to order.

No voting occurred in Southern Ireland as all the seats were filled by unopposed returns. Except for Dublin University all constituencies outside Northern Ireland elected Sinn Féin TDs. The Second Dáil first met on 16 August 1921, thereby dissolving the First Dáil. The Third Dáil was also elected under the constituencies established by the Government of Ireland Act 1920. On 6 December 1922, this became the house of representatives of the new Irish Free State.

From the Electoral Act 1923 the Irish Free State defined its own Dáil constituencies. National University of Ireland was reduced to three seats. This Act abolished plural voting for University constituencies and enfranchised women on the same terms as men. Qualified voters could register for a university or a territorial constituency but not for both. The qualifications for an elector to be registered as a university voter were set out in Section 1(2)(c) of the 1923 Act. They were to be registered at "the University constituency comprising a university in which he or she has received a degree other than an honorary degree".

The Constitution (Amendment No. 23) Act 1936 repealed provisions of the Constitution of the Irish Free State providing for University representation in Dáil Éireann, with effect from the next dissolution of the Oireachtas which took place on 14 June 1937. The seat left vacant by Conor Maguire in 1936 on his appointment to the High Court was not filled.

Seanad Éireann
Article 18.4 of the Constitution of Ireland adopted in 1937, provided that the National University of Ireland would have three seats in the new Seanad Éireann. The Seanad Electoral (University Members) Act 1937 gave effect to this constitutional provision, with graduates of the National University of Ireland entitled to elect Senators by single transferable vote. The first Seanad election took place in 1938, and thereafter elections to the Seanad take place within 90 days of the dissolution of the Dáil. The Seventh Amendment, adopted in 1979, allows for a redistribution of the six university seats among the Dublin University, the National University of Ireland, and any other institutions of higher education in the State which do not have representation. No legislation followed since to make any such change.

Political party labels do not appear on Seanad election ballot papers.

Elections

2020 election

2016 election

2011 election

2007 election

2002 election

1997 election

1992 election

1989 election

1933 election

Seat vacant in November 1936 on appointment of Maguire as a Justice of the High Court

1932 election

September 1927 election

June 1927 election

1923 by-election
Caused by the resignation of Eoin MacNeill.

1923 election

1922 election

1921 election

|}
Sinn Féin refused to recognise the Southern Ireland House of Commons and took their seats as TDs in the Second Dáil.

1918 election
The 1918 general election took place on 14 December and the results were declared on 28 December, except for the university constituencies. NUI voted between 18 and 22 December and the result was declared on 23 December.

In common with other Sinn Féin MPs, Eoin MacNeill abstained from Westminster and took his seat as a TD in the First Dáil. He was also elected for Londonderry City.

See also
List of United Kingdom Parliament constituencies in Ireland and Northern Ireland
List of MPs elected in the 1918 United Kingdom general election
Historic Dáil constituencies
Dáil Éireann (Irish Republic)
Dublin University (constituency)
Queen's University of Belfast (UK Parliament constituency)

References

Sources

National University of Ireland
Constituencies of the Parliament of the United Kingdom disestablished in 1922
Constituencies of the Parliament of the United Kingdom established in 1918
University constituencies in the Republic of Ireland
University constituencies of the Parliament of the United Kingdom
Seanad constituencies